The 1941 St. Louis Browns season was a season in American baseball. It involved the Browns finishing 6th in the American League with a record of 70 wins and 84 losses.

Offseason 
 November 16, 1940: George Caster was selected off waivers by the Browns from the Philadelphia Athletics.

Regular season 
The 1941 season marked a change in management, as Luke Sewell was appointed the Browns new manager on June 5, 1941. While the St. Louis Cardinals drew over 600,000 fans, the Browns barely drew 175,000. The consensus was that St. Louis could not support two teams.

Potential move to Los Angeles 
The Browns ownership had reached an agreement to move the franchise to Los Angeles. The Los Angeles Chamber of Commerce had guaranteed attendance of 500,000, a figure that the Browns had not seen since their 1924 season. The Browns would play in the stadium that was used by the Pacific Coast League's Los Angeles Angels. As part of the agreement to move to Los Angeles, the Browns would buy the stadium. It was expected that all Major League Baseball owners would approve of the move at the upcoming Winter Meetings. Before the scheduled meetings, the Japanese bombed Pearl Harbor, and California would stay closed to Major League Baseball for another decade.

Season standings

Record vs. opponents

Notable transactions 
 May 5, 1941: Rip Radcliff was purchased from the Browns by the Detroit Tigers for $25,000.

Roster

Player stats

Batting

Starters by position 
Note: Pos = Position; G = Games played; AB = At bats; H = Hits; Avg. = Batting average; HR = Home runs; RBI = Runs batted in

Other batters 
Note: G = Games played; AB = At bats; H = Hits; Avg. = Batting average; HR = Home runs; RBI = Runs batted in

Pitching

Starting pitchers 
Note: G = Games pitched; IP = Innings pitched; W = Wins; L = Losses; ERA = Earned run average; SO = Strikeouts

Other pitchers 
Note: G = Games pitched; IP = Innings pitched; W = Wins; L = Losses; ERA = Earned run average; SO = Strikeouts

Relief pitchers 
Note: G = Games pitched; W = Wins; L = Losses; SV = Saves; ERA = Earned run average; SO = Strikeouts

Farm system 

St. Joseph franchise transferred to Carthage and renamed, June 3, 1941

References

External links
1941 St. Louis Browns team page at Baseball Reference
1941 St. Louis Browns season at baseball-almanac.com

St. Louis Browns seasons
Saint Louis Browns season
1941 establishments in Missouri
St Louis Browns